Revival is the fifth studio album by Bellowhead. It was announced at their 10th anniversary concerts in Manchester and London.

The album consists mainly of traditional folk songs and sea shanties. Unusually for the band, the album includes a cover: "I Want to See the Bright Lights Tonight" (Richard and Linda Thompson).

Track listing

Deluxe edition (CD 2)

Personnel
Jon Boden – lead vocals, fiddle, tambourine
Pete Flood – percussion
Brendan Kelly – saxophone, bass clarinet
Benji Kirkpatrick – guitars, bouzouki, mandolin, banjo, vocals
Rachael McShane – cello, fiddle, vocals
Andy Mellon – trumpet
Ed Neuhauser – tuba, helicon
Paul Sartin – fiddle, oboe, vocals
John Spiers – melodeon, anglo-concertina
Sam Sweeney – fiddle, vocals
Justin Thurgur – trombone

References

Bellowhead albums
2014 albums